School District 10 is a defunct Canadian school district in New Brunswick.  It was an Anglophone district operating 16 public schools (gr. K-12) in Charlotte County.  Enrollment was approximately 4,000 students and 350 teachers.  District 10 was headquartered in St. Stephen.  In 2012 it was amalgamated into Anglophone South School District.

List of schools

High schools
 Fundy High School
 Sir James Dunn Academy
 St. Stephen High School

Middle schools
 St. Stephen Middle School

Elementary schools
 Back Bay Elementary School
 Blacks Harbour School
 Lawrence Station Elementary School
 Milltown Elementary School
Pennfield Elementary School
 St. George Elementary School
 St. Stephen Elementary School
 Vincent Massey Elementary School
 White Head Elementary School

Combined schools
 Deer Island Community School
 Fundy Shores School
 Campobello Island Consolidated School
Grand Manan Community School

Other schools

 St. Stephen High School (LC)

External links
 http://www.district10.nbed.nb.ca

Former school districts in New Brunswick